Persatuan Bola Basket Seluruh Indonesia, abbreviated as PERBASI, is the main basketball regulatory organizations in Indonesia. Founded on 23 October 1951, the organization has its headquarters in Jakarta.

History
The association was founded in 1952, when Tony Wen and Wim Latumeten requested by Maladi who was then serving as Secretary of KONI to develop basketball sports organizations Indonesia. On 23 October 1952, Indonesia basketball association formed under the name Persatuan Basketball Seluruh Indonesia abbreviated as PERBASI. Tony Wen positions as chairman and the secretary is Wim Latumeten. At 1955, the name was changed and adapted to the Indonesian vocabulary, become Persatuan Bola Basket Seluruh Indonesia, but still abbreviated as PERBASI.

See also
 Indonesia men's national basketball team
 Indonesia women's national basketball team
 Indonesia men's national 3x3 team
 Indonesia women's national 3x3 team

References

External links
 Official site of PERBASI

Basketball
Basketball in Indonesia
Basketball governing bodies in Asia
Sports organizations established in 1952